Yukhan (also Romanized as Yūkhān) is a village in Darkhoveyn Rural District, in the Central District of Shadegan County, Khuzestan Province, Iran. At the 2006 census, its population was 776, in 133 families.

References 

Populated places in Shadegan County